Dolores is a town in Buenos Aires Province, Argentina. It is the administrative centre for Dolores Partido.
The town settlement was officially founded by Ramón Lara on 21 August 1817.

2008 March train disaster
On March 9, 2008 an intercity bus from the company El Rápido Argentino collided with a Ferrobaires passenger train with 250 passengers on board at a level crossing on the Provincial Highway 63 on the outskirts of Dolores, killing seventeen people and injuring at least twenty-five. The bus driver disregarded the railroad crossing signals, which at the time of the accident were operating properly.

Climate

Dolores has an Oceanic climate (Köppen Cfb) closely bordering on a Humid subtropical climate (Köppen Cfa).

Gallery

References

External links

 Dolores website
 Municipal website
 Dolores Aeroclub
 Dos Ombúes - Turismo Natural & Cultural
 No a la tala - Group for a healthy and sustainable
 Dolores LiveArgentina

Populated places in Buenos Aires Province
Populated places established in 1817
Cities in Argentina
Argentina